Deep Zone Project is a Bulgarian house/electro band formed in 1998 by DJ Dian Solo, JuraTone and Rossko. They are most famous for their collaboration with DJ Balthazar, representing Bulgaria at the Eurovision Song Contest 2008 with the song "DJ, Take Me Away". The band has released five albums and has had a number of successful singles on the Bulgarian charts and has won many national and international awards. Their vocalist until early 2011 was Yoanna Dragneva; after leaving for a solo career, she was replaced by Nadia.

Formation
Deep Zone Project was formed in 1998 by three musicians, DJs and studio engineers. They were DJ Dian Solo (Dian Savov), JuraTone (Lyubomir Savov, Dian's father) and Rossko (Rosen Stoev).

DJ Dian was an accomplished musician who played the piano, saxophone, electric guitar and bass. In 1993, he had started as a DJ and in 1998 was selected "Best DJ of the Year". JuraTone was a multi-instrumentalist born in 1953 who played the flute, banjo, guitar, and had been part of many Bulgarian and European rock formations for 15 years and founder of his own recording studio. For vocals they included Joanna (born 1986, full name Yoanna Dragneva) as a founding member. She used to be in the vocal Bulgarian group Bon-Bon (in Bulgarian Бон-бон) presenting children shows on television and later co-hosting Hello and Melo TV Mania shows.

Career
After the release of their debut album Ela Izgrei in 2002, Deep Zone Project were nominated in five categories at the 2002 MM TV Music Awards. They won the award for "Best Song". In 2003, they won "Best Club Track of the Year" at the MM TV Awards Ceremony for their track "Caffeine-free".

Their hit "DJ, Take Me Away" reached the number 2 position at MTV Europe's World Chart Express and won the Bulgarian Eurovision 2008 song contest selection process. At the Eurovision semi-finals, however, the song finished 12th and did not make it to the finals.

The collaboration with DJ Balthazar took the group to another dimension with their national club tours Welcome To The Loop and Red Line (20 dates each), which gathered an audience of nearly 80,000 people.

In 2010, they released "On Fire", a big-budget production in Bulgaria terms with cooperation from actor Fahradin Fahradinov.

In 2011, Joanna left the Deep Zone Project to develop a solo career. She was replaced by vocalist Nadia (full name Nadia Petrova), with recording of "I Love My Dj" as her debut with Deep Zone. The song won the 2012 "Bulgarian Best Track of the Year".

In February 2015 it was announced that Alex and Nadia had left the band to develop solo careers.

In 2015, Nelina Georgieva became the vocalist but her contract with the band only lasted for three years. In January 2018, she left the band and she was replaced by Eva Maria Petrova.

Members 
 DJ Dian Solo (Dian Savov) — DJ, composer / beatcreator, keyboards
 JuraTone (Lyubomir Savov Mikhailov) — guitar, composer / arranger
 Eva-Maria Petrova — vocals (2018-)
 Starlight (Svetlin Kuslev) — saxophonist
Former members
 Rossko (Rosen Stoev) — DJ, sound engineer, Laser Harp 
 Julie (Julie) - vocals (2011-2011)
 Joanna (Yoanna Dragneva) — vocals (2008-2011)
 Startrax (Alex Kiprov) — keyboards, studio engineer
 Nadia (Nadezhda Petrova)— vocals (2011-2015)
 Nelina (Nelina Georgieva) - vocals (2015-2018)

Discography

Albums
 2002: Ela Izgrei
 2003: Vlizam v teb
 2006: Ledeno kafe
 2008: DJ, Take Me Away
 2010: Dance Energy
 2014: Niama NE 
 2015: ''Maski Dolu

Singles

Sources

External links 

 DJ Balthazar official website
 Deep Zone official website

Bulgarian musical groups
Eurovision Song Contest entrants for Bulgaria
Eurovision Song Contest entrants of 2008
Culture in Varna, Bulgaria